The Cherie Quarters Cabins are two single-storey slave quarters cabins which are the only two surviving of thirty or more original cabins on the River Lake (or Riverlake) plantation. They were listed on the National Register of Historic Places in 1995.

They are wood-frame buildings supported by brick piers.

Riverlake, the main plantation house, is a raised Creole-style built c.1820, which was listed on the National Register in 1983.

References

National Register of Historic Places in Pointe Coupee Parish, Louisiana
Buildings and structures completed in 1840
Slave cabins and quarters in the United States